Castellinaldo d'Alba is a comune (municipality) in the Province of Cuneo in the Italian region Piedmont, located about  southeast of Turin and about  northeast of Cuneo.

Castellinaldo borders the following municipalities: Canale, Castagnito, Magliano Alfieri, Priocca, and Vezza d'Alba.

Demographic evolution

References

Cities and towns in Piedmont
Roero